The San Mateo Daily Journal is a daily newspaper published six days a week, Monday through Friday plus a combo weekend edition. The newspaper is distributed throughout San Mateo County, California.

Operations
The Daily Journal's publisher is Jerry Lee and its editor is Jon Mays. A 2007 poll on its website indicated its readers consider it to be politically moderate. It is one of the few independently owned and operated newspapers in the San Francisco Bay Area.

In 2008, there was an incident of racks of the papers being cleaned out by a man working for a competing newspaper, Palo Alto Daily Post.

The Washington Post stated that the paper is one of the few publications that report on East Palo Alto within San Mateo County.

References

Daily newspapers published in the San Francisco Bay Area
San Mateo, California
Newspapers established in 2000
2000 establishments in California